WLCJ-LP (92.5 FM) is a radio station broadcasting a Catholic religious format. Licensed to Marinette, Wisconsin, United States, the station is currently owned by Venite Adoremus and features programming from Relevant Radio.

References

External links
 

LCJ-LP
Catholic radio stations
Radio stations established in 2004
2004 establishments in Wisconsin
LCJ-LP